Censor bars are a basic form of text, photography, and video censorship in which "sensitive" information or images are occluded by black, gray, or white rectangular boxes. These bars have been used to censor various parts of images. Since the creation of digital editing software which can apply less obtrusive effects such as pixelization and blurring, censor bars are typically used for satire, although they remain in contemporary use to address privacy concerns. Censor bars are also used in art forms such as blackout poetry.

Censor bars may also have the words 'censored', 'redacted', 'private information', 'sensitive information', etc. to indicate their presence.

Illustrations of usage

See also

 Sanitization (classified information)

References

External links

Censorship